Robin Montgomery was the reigning champion,  but chose not to participate.

Alex Eala won the title, defeating Lucie Havlíčková in the final, 6–2, 6–4. Eala became the first Philippine player to win the girls' title in the major, and the first player from Southeast Asia since Angelique Widjaja at the 2002 French Open. Eala also became the first player to win the title without losing a set throughout the tournament since Amanda Anisimova at the 2017 US Open.

Seeds

Main draw

Finals

Top half

Section 1

Section 2

Bottom half

Section 3

Section 4

Qualifying

Seeds

Qualifiers

Draw

First qualifier

Second qualifier

Third qualifier

Fourth qualifier

Fifth qualifier

Sixth qualifier

Seventh qualifier

Eighth qualifier

References

External links 
 Draw at ITFtennis.com
 Main draw at usopen.com
 Qualifying draw at usopen.com

Girls' Singles
2022